Narayan Chandra is a first-class and List A cricketer from Bangladesh.  He was born on 8 December 1979 in Narayanganj, Dhaka and is a right-handed batsman and right arm medium-fast bowler.  He is sometimes referred to on scoresheets by his nickname Tapu.  He played for Barisal Division in 2000/01 but found success hard to come by in both forms of the game.

References

Barisal Division cricketers
Bangladeshi cricketers
Bangladeshi Hindus
Living people
1979 births
People from Narayanganj District